El Almendro is a town and municipality located in the province of Huelva, Spain. According to the 2005 census, the city has a population of 831 inhabitants.

Demographics

Main sights 
 Church of Guadalupe
 Hermitage of Piedras Albas

References

External links
El Almendro - Sistema de Información Multiterritorial de Andalucía

Municipalities in the Province of Huelva